German submarine U-1131 was a Type VIIC U-boat of Nazi Germany's Kriegsmarine during World War II.

She was ordered on 25 August 1941, and was laid down on 6 February 1943 at Howaldtswerke AG, Kiel, as yard number 33. She was launched on 3 April 1944 and commissioned under the command of Oberleutnant zur See Günther Fiebig on 20 May 1944.

Design
German Type VIIC submarines were preceded by the shorter Type VIIB submarines. U-1131 had a displacement of  when at the surface and  while submerged. She had two shafts and two  propellers.

U-1131 was fitted with five  torpedo tubes (four fitted at the bow and one at the stern), fourteen torpedoes or 26 TMA mines, one  SK C/35 naval gun, (220 rounds), one  Flak M42 and two twin  C/30 anti-aircraft guns. The boat had a complement of between 44 — 52 men.

Service history
On 30 March 1945, U-1131 was sunk by bombs while inside a pontoon dock southeast of the U-boat bunker Fink II at Hamburg-Finkenwerder. U-1131 was caught in a US 8th Air Force raid. The wreck was later broken up.

References

Bibliography

External links

German Type VIIC submarines
U-boats commissioned in 1944
World War II submarines of Germany
Ships built in Kiel
1944 ships
Maritime incidents in March 1945